The individual dressage at the 2011 European Dressage Championships in Rotterdam, The Netherlands was held at Kralingen-Crooswijk from August 17 and August 21, 2011.

The Netherlands's Adelinde Cornelissen won the gold medal in the Grand Prix Special and the Grand Prix Freestyle. Carl Hester representing Great Britain won a silver medal the Grand Prix Special and silver in the Grand Prix Freestyle. Laura Bechtolsheimer of Great Britain won a bronze in the Special and Patrik Kittel of Sweden won bronze in the Freestyle. In the Grand Prix Great Britain won the golden team medal, while Germany won the silver medal and The Netherlands bronze.

Competition format
The team and individual dressage competitions used the same results. Dressage had three phases. The first phase was the Grand Prix. Top 30 individuals advanced to the second phase, the Grand Prix Special where the first individual medals were awarded. The last set of medals at the 2011 European Dressage Championships was awarded after the third phase, the Grand Prix Freestyle where top 15 combinations competed, with a maximum of the three best riders per country.

Judges
The European Dressage Championships was assessed by seven judges.
  Ghislain Fouarge (Ground Jury President)
  Mary Seefried (Ground Jury Member)
  Evi Eisenhardt (Ground Jury Member)
  Maribel Alonso de Quinzanos (Ground Jury Member)
  Wojtek Markowski (Ground Jury Member)
  Stephen Clarke (Ground Jury Member)
  Jean-Michel Roudier (Ground Jury Member)
  Gary Rockwell (Reserve judge)

Schedule

All times are Central European Summer Time (UTC+1)

Results

References

2011 in equestrian